The first cabinet of Miron Cristea was the government of Romania from 10 February 1938 to 31 March 1938. Miron Cristea was the Patriarch of the Romanian Orthodox Church since 1925.

Ministers
The ministers of the cabinet were as follows:

President of the Council of Ministers:
Miron Cristea (10 February - 31 March 1938)
Minister of the Interior:
Armand Călinescu (10 February - 31 March 1938)
Minister of Foreign Affairs: 
(interim) Gheorghe Tătărăscu (10 February - 31 March 1938)
Minister of Finance:
Mircea Cancicov (10 February - 31 March 1938)
Minister of Justice:
(interim) Mircea Cancicov (10 February - 31 March 1938)
Minister of National Defence:
Gen. Ion Antonescu (10 February - 31 March 1938)
Minister of Air and Marine:
(interim) Gen. Ion Antonescu (10 February - 31 March 1938)
Minister of Agriculture, Property, and Cooperation
Gheorghe Ionescu-Sisești (10 February - 31 March 1938)
Minister of Industry and Commerce:
Constantin Argetoianu (10 February - 31 March 1938)
Minister of Public Works and Communications:
Constantin Angelescu (10 February - 31 March 1938)
Minister of National Education:
Victor Iamandi (10 February - 31 March 1938)
Minister of Religious Affairs and the Arts:
(interim) Victor Iamandi (10 February - 31 March 1938)
Minister of Labour:
Voicu Nițescu (10 February - 31 March 1938)
Minister of Health and Social Security
Ion Costinescu (10 February - 31 March 1938)
Minister of  Cooperation: 
Stan Ghițescu (10 February - 31 March 1938)

Ministers of State:

Armand Călinescu (10 February - 31 March 1938)
Gheorghe Tătărăscu (10 February - 31 March 1938)
Mircea Cancicov (10 February - 31 March 1938)
Constantin Argetoianu (10 February - 31 March 1938)
Constantin Angelescu (10 February - 31 March 1938)
Marshal Alexandru Averescu (10 February - 31 March 1938)
Gen. Artur Văitoianu (10 February - 31 March 1938)
Alexandru Vaida-Voevod (10 February - 31 March 1938)
Gheorghe Mironescu (10 February - 31 March 1938)
Nicolae Iorga (10 February - 31 March 1938)

References

Cabinets of Romania
Cabinets established in 1938
Cabinets disestablished in 1938
1938 establishments in Romania
1938 disestablishments in Romania